The Haima M8 is a mid-size sedan produced in China from 2013 to 2017 under the Haima brand.

Overview 

The Haima M8 Turbo debuted in October 2014 featuring a 1.8 liter turbo engine that later became the remaining option at the end of its lifecycle. The pricing of the Haima M6 ranges from 126,800 yuan to 166,800 yuan.

References

External links 

 Haima official website

Haima vehicles
Mid-size cars
Sedans
Front-wheel-drive vehicles
Cars introduced in 2013
Cars of China